Zainun bin Mat Noor is a Malaysian politician from UMNO. He has been the Member of Perak State Legislative Assembly for Chenderoh from 2013 to November 2022.

Politics 
He is the Deputy Chairman of UMNO Padang Rengas branch.

Election result

Honours
 :
 Officer of the Order of the Defender of the Realm (KMN) (2009)
 :
 Knight Commander of the Order of the Perak State Crown (DPMP) – Dato' (2015)

External links

References 

Officers of the Order of the Defender of the Realm
United Malays National Organisation politicians
Members of the Perak State Legislative Assembly
Malaysian people of Malay descent
Living people
Year of birth missing (living people)